Yobareh or Yabareh or Yebareh may refer to:
 Yobareh, Ahvaz
 Yabareh, Shushtar